Pasaki (also Romanized as Pasakī) is a village in Jowzar Rural District, in the Central District of Mamasani County, Fars Province, Iran. At the 2006 census, its population was 19, in 5 families.

References 

Populated places in Mamasani County